Charles Vincent Anstey Duggleby (born 23 January 1939) was a presenter of the long-running personal finance series on BBC Radio 4, Money Box until 2013.
An expert on UK paper money, Duggleby published a reference work on the subject which is now in its 9th edition.

Career
He launched Money Box in 1977, and Money Box Live in 1990 (during a recession).

Personal life
He married Elizabeth Frost in Totnes, south Devon, in 1964. They have two daughters (born in 1966 and 1968). His eldest daughter has worked for BBC News. He lives in Torquay.

Publications
 English Paper Money, 1975
 Making the Most of Your Money

References

1939 births
BBC Radio 4 presenters
British business and financial journalists
Mass media people from Torquay
Living people